Daryl L. Simmons is an American R&B musician, songwriter and record producer, who worked with the production duo of L.A. Reid and Kenneth "Babyface" Edmonds. In 1977–1980 Daryl, with Manchild (band) recorded 2 soul & funk albums & the minor hit "Especially for You" on the Label Chi Sound Records, Manchild included: Kenneth Babyface Edmonds, Reggie Griffin, Charles "Chuckie" Bush & others.

He has written and composed songs such as "End Of The Road" (Boyz II Men), "Super Woman" (Karyn White), "Breathe Again" (Toni Braxton), "I'm Ready" (Tevin Campbell),  "Baby Baby Baby" (TLC), "My My My" (Johnny Gill), "We're Not Making Love No More" (Dru Hill) and "Queen of the Night" (Whitney Houston).

Awards and nominations
Grammy Awards

References

Living people
American keyboardists
Record producers from Indiana
Songwriters from Indiana
Grammy Award winners
Musicians from Indianapolis
Year of birth missing (living people)